Kalgi is a village in Hiiumaa Parish, Hiiu County in northwestern Estonia.

The village was formed between 1920s and 1930s. Historically, the areas of village were part of Suuremõisa Manor.

1977–1997 the village was part of Viilupi village.

References
 

Villages in Hiiu County